Franco Da Dalt  (born 10 September 1987) is an Argentine footballer who plays in Italy for Lamezia Terme.

Biography
On 29 August 2003, he was loaned to Sampdoria along with Nicola Cremasco. In summer 2005, he was signed by Triestina.

In July 2008 he was signed by Verona in July 2008.

In August 2010, he signed a 1-year contract with Como, rejoining former teammate Christian Conti.

On 2 August 2018, he joined Serie D club Campobasso.

On 11 August 2021, he returned to Serie D after one season in Serie C with Turris and signed with Lamezia Terme.

References

External links

1987 births
Living people
People from Ituzaingó, Corrientes
Argentine footballers
Argentine expatriate footballers
Association football forwards
U.C. Sampdoria players
Venezia F.C. players
U.S. Triestina Calcio 1918 players
Calcio Foggia 1920 players
S.S.D. Varese Calcio players
Hellas Verona F.C. players
A.S.D. Città di Foligno 1928 players
Como 1907 players
U.S. Vibonese Calcio players
S.S. Turris Calcio players
F.C. Lamezia Terme players
Serie B players
Serie C players
Serie D players
Expatriate footballers in Italy
Argentine expatriate sportspeople in Italy
Sportspeople from Corrientes Province